John Pass may refer to:
 John Pass (poet), Canadian poet
 John Pass (engraver), English engraver and murder victim